Woodberry Glacier is a small tributary glacier flowing south between Evans Heights and Mount Fearon to the north side of David Glacier, in Victoria Land. Mapped by United States Geological Survey (USGS) from surveys and U.S. Navy air photos, 1956–62. Named by Advisory Committee on Antarctic Names (US-ACAN) for Barry D. Woodberry, ionospheric physicist with the South Pole Station winter party, 1966.

Glaciers of Scott Coast